Elísio Miguel Oliveira Pais (born 22 February 1998) is a Portuguese professional footballer who plays for Castro Daire as a goalkeeper.

Football career
On 6 August 2016, Pais made his professional debut with Académico Viseu in a 2016–17 LigaPro match against Vizela.

References

External links

Stats and profile at LPFP 

1998 births
Living people
People from Viseu
Portuguese footballers
Association football goalkeepers
Académico de Viseu F.C. players
Liga Portugal 2 players
Campeonato de Portugal (league) players
Sportspeople from Viseu District